The 2007 Italian Speedway Grand Prix was the first event in the 2007 Speedway Grand Prix season.  It was held on 28 April 2007 in the Stadio Speedway Santa Marina in Lonigo, Italy.

Starting positions draw 
The Speedway Grand Prix Commission nominated Mattia Carpanese as Wild Card, and Daniele Tessari and Christian Miotello both as Track Reserve.

(6) Hans N. Andersen (Denmark)
(9) Jarosław Hampel (Poland)
(8) Tomasz Gollob (Poland)
(14) Rune Holta (Poland)
(12) Bjarne Pedersen (Denmark)
(1) Jason Crump (Australia)
(7) Matej Žagar (Slovenia)
(4) Andreas Jonsson (Sweden)
(16) Mattia Carpanese (Italy)
(2) Greg Hancock (United States)
(15) Chris Harris (United Kingdom)
(10) Antonio Lindbäck (Sweden)
(3) Nicki Pedersen (Denmark)
(5) Leigh Adams (Australia)
(11) Scott Nicholls (United Kingdom)
(13) Wiesław Jaguś (Poland)
(17) Daniele Tessari (Italy)
(18) Christian Miotello (Italy)

Heat details

Heat Results 
Hampel, Andersen, Gollob, Holta (x)
Crump, Jonsson, Žagar, Tessari; B.Pedersen (t)
Hancock, Harris, Lindbäck, Carpanese
N.Pedersen, Adams, Nicholls, Jaguś
N.Pedersen, Carpanese, Andersen, B.Pedersen
Hancock, Adams, Crump, Hampel
Gollob, Harris, Nicholls, Žagar
Jaguś, Jonsson, Lindbäck, Holta
Jaguś, Crump, Andersen, Harris
B.Pedersen, Nicholls, Hampel, Lindbäck
Gollob, Jonsson, Adams, Miotello; Carpanese (m)
N.Pedersen, Hancock, Žagar, Holta (x)
Adams, Andersen, Lindbäck, Žagar
N.Pedersen, Hampel, Harris, Jonsson
Jaguś, Hancock, B.Pedersen, Gollob
Crump, Holta, Nicholls (x), Carpanese (f)
Andersen, Hancock, Jonsson, Nicholls
Žagar, Hampel, Jaguś, Carpanese
N.Pedersen, Gollob, Crump, Lindbäck
Adams, Harris, B.Pedersen, Holta
Semi-finals:
N.Pedersen, Jaguś, Gollob, Andersen
Hancock, Crump, Adams, Hampel
Great Final:
N.Pedersen, Hancock, Jaguś, Crump

The intermediate classification

See also 
 List of Speedway Grand Prix riders

References 

Italy
2007